Kendrix is a surname. Notable people with the surname include: 

 Cory Kendrix (born 1988), American musician
 Gerrid Kendrix, American businessman, accountant, and politician
 Moss H. Kendrix (1917–1989), American public relations specialist

See also
 Kendrix Morgan, Power Rangers character